Live at Macalester College is a live album by saxophonist/flautist Byard Lancaster and drummer J. R. Mitchell originally released in 1972 on the Dogtown label and rereleased in 2008 on CD by Porter Records.

Reception

The AllMusic review by Thom Jurek stated "This is an incredible document of post-Coltrane free jazz". On All About Jazz, Hrayr Attarian noted "Despite the virtuosic musical ideas flowing out of everyone's instrument the recording itself fails to stand as a single multifaceted unit, but instead has the feel of a hodge-podge of different sounds, ideas and styles".

Track listing
All compositions by Byard Lancaster
 "1324" – 16:29
 "Last Summer" – 3:25
 "War World" – 6:35
 "Live at Macalester" – 10:38
 "World in Me" – 9:01 Additional track on CD reissue
 "Thought" – 15:01 Additional track on CD reissue

Personnel 
Byard Lancaster – soprano saxophone, alto saxophone, tenor saxophone, flute, bass clarinet, trumpet
J. R. Mitchell – percussion
Sid Simmons – piano (tracks 2–4)
Lance Gunderson – guitar (track 6)
Calvin Hill – bass (tracks 1, 5 & 6)
Jerome Hunter (tracks 2–4), Paul Morrison (track 1) – electric bass
Lester Lumley – congas, percussion (track 1)

References 

1972 live albums
Byard Lancaster albums
J. R. Mitchell albums
Porter Records live albums